The House at 44 Linden Street in Brookline, Massachusetts, is a little-altered local example of Second Empire styling.  The -story house was built in 1874 by Solomon Eaton on land that was owned for many years by Thomas Aspinwall Davis.  It has classic Second Empire features, including a mansard roof, polygonal bay windows, and brownstone window arches.  The only significant alteration is a sunporch on the left side.  It was converted into a two-family in 1923.

The house was listed on the National Register of Historic Places in 1985.

See also
National Register of Historic Places listings in Brookline, Massachusetts

References

Houses in Brookline, Massachusetts
Second Empire architecture in Massachusetts
Houses completed in 1872
National Register of Historic Places in Brookline, Massachusetts
Houses on the National Register of Historic Places in Norfolk County, Massachusetts